The Silver State Cup is a regional soccer competition between the two USL Championship clubs located in the state of Nevada, Las Vegas Lights FC and Reno 1868 FC. Only league matches count in the competition, with a win earning three points and a draw earning one point.

Match Results

2018

2019

2020
On December 20, 2019, the USL announced the 2020 season schedule, creating the following fixture list for the cup competition.

References 

Las Vegas Lights FC
Reno 1868 FC
Soccer cup competitions in the United States